Importin 8 is a protein that in humans is encoded by the IPO8 gene.

Function 

The importin-alpha/beta complex and the GTPase Ran mediate nuclear import of proteins with a classical nuclear localization signal. The protein encoded by this gene is a member of a class of approximately 20 potential Ran targets that share a sequence motif related to the Ran-binding site of importin-beta. This protein binds to the nuclear pore complex and, along with RanGTP and RANBP1, inhibits the GAP stimulation of the Ran GTPase. Alternatively spliced transcript variants encoding different isoforms have been found for this gene. [provided by RefSeq, Jul 2010].

References

Further reading